River of Dreams is the twelfth and final studio album by American singer-songwriter Billy Joel, released on August 10, 1993. River of Dreams presented a more serious tone than found in Joel's previous albums, dealing with issues such as trust and long-lasting love. It was rumored that the themes of trust and betrayal, particularly certain lyrics from the songs "A Minor Variation" and "The Great Wall of China", stem from Joel's legal disputes with his former manager and ex-brother-in-law, Frank Weber, who reportedly embezzled millions of dollars from Joel and used dubious accounting practices to cover it up.

As of 2022, River of Dreams is the last rock album Joel has released. The last studio album he released was Fantasies & Delusions in 2001, a classical recording featuring solo piano performed by Hyung-ki "Richard" Joo. Since River of Dreams, Joel has recorded occasional pop/rock singles and continues to play live.

The album cover was a painting by Joel's then-wife, Christie Brinkley. In 1993, Rolling Stone gave her the Top Picks award for "The Best Album Cover of the Year".

Background
In the summer of 1992, Billy Joel held a series of writing and recording sessions on Shelter Island, New York; these sessions eventually produced seven tracks, self-produced by Joel.

Joel was dissatisfied with the results, and so, on the recommendation of Don Henley, he brought in session guitarist Danny Kortchmar for another take on the songs. Kortchmar agreed to produce, provided he be allowed to use session musicians on the recordings, to which Joel agreed. Only one song from the Shelter Island sessions, "Shades of Grey", would make the final album in its original produced form.

Track listing
All songs were written and composed by Billy Joel.

"No Man's Land" – 4:48
"The Great Wall of China" – 5:45
"Blonde Over Blue" – 4:55
"A Minor Variation" – 5:36
"Shades of Grey" – 4:10
"All About Soul" – 5:59
"Lullabye (Goodnight, My Angel)" – 3:32
"The River of Dreams" – 4:05
"Two Thousand Years" – 5:19
"Famous Last Words" – 5:01

A Voyage on the River of Dreams
A Voyage on the River of Dreams is an Australian 3-CD box set released in 1994, which includes the studio album, River of Dreams, along with a 6-track live CD from the '93–'94 River of Dreams Tour, plus a Questions & Answers CD recorded at Princeton University. This box set made the charts in Australia (No. 33) and New Zealand (No. 47), the only places besides Japan where the set was officially released.

Disc one (River of Dreams – Studio album) – as per original album

Disc two (Billy Joel Live)
All songs written and composed by Billy Joel, except where noted
"Goodbye Yellow Brick Road" (Elton John/Bernie Taupin) – 5:08
"No Man's Land" – 5:44
"The Ballad of Billy the Kid" – 5:52
"Lullabye (Goodnight, My Angel)" – 3:40
"The River of Dreams" – 5:28
"A Hard Day's Night" (Lennon–McCartney) – 3:20

Disc three (Questions & Answers Disc)
"Q & A recorded at Princeton University"

Personnel 
 Billy Joel – lead vocals, clavinet (1, 4), Hammond organ (1, 4, 6, 8, 10), acoustic piano (2, 6–10), organ (2, 9), backing vocals (2), synthesizers (3, 8), keyboards (5)
 Jeff Jacobs – synthesizers (2), additional programming (8)
 Tommy Byrnes – guitars (1, 3, 5, 6)
 Danny Kortchmar – guitars (1–4, 6, 8–10)
 Leslie West – guitars (1, 2, 4)
 Mike Tyler – guitars (8)
 T.M. Stevens – bass (1, 2, 4, 6, 9, 10)
 Lonnie Hillyer – bass (3, 8)
 Schuyler Deale – bass (5)
 Jeff Lee Johnson – bass (8)
 Chuck Treece – bass (8)
 Zachary Alford – drums (1, 2, 3, 4, 6, 8)
 Liberty DeVitto – drums (5)
 Steve Jordan – drums (9, 10)
 Jim Saporito – percussion (2)
 Andy Kravitz – percussion (8)
 Arno Hecht – baritone saxophone (4)
 Richie Cannata – tenor saxophone (4)
 Osvaldo Melindez – trombone (4)
 Laurence Etkin – trumpet (4)
 Ira Newborn – orchestrations (2, 6–8)
 Lewis Del Gatto – orchestra manager (2, 6–8)
 Frank Simms – backing vocals (1, 2, 8)
 George Simms – backing vocals (1, 2, 8)
 Color Me Badd – guest vocals (6)
 Wrecia Ford – backing vocals (6, 8)
 Marlon Saunders – backing vocals (6, 8)
 Crystal Taliefero – backing vocals (6, 8), vocal arrangement (6, 8)
 B. David Witworth – backing vocals (6, 8)
 Curtis Rance King, Jr. – choir conductor and contractor (6)
 Choir on "All About Soul" – Phillip Ballou, Katreese Barnes, Dennis Collins, Will Downing, Frank Floyd, Diane Garisto, Stephanie James, Devora Johnson, Marlon Saunders and Corliss Stafford

Production
 Producers – Danny Kortchmar (Tracks 1–4 & 6–10); Billy Joel (Track 5).
 Associate Producer on Track 5 – David Thoener 
 Co-Producer on Track 8 – Joe Nicolo 
  A&R – Don DeVito
 Production Coordinator – Bill Zampino
 Engineers – Carl Glanville (Tracks 1–7, 9 & 10); Joe Nicolo and Phil Nicolo (Track 8).
 Assistant Engineers – Dan Hetzel and Brian Vibberts (Tracks 1–7, 9 & 10); Dick Grobelny (Track 8).
 Recorded by Jay Healy, Bradshaw Leigh, Bob Thrasher and Dave Wilkerson.
 Mixing – Niko Bolas (Tracks 1–4, 6, 7, 9, 10); David Thoener (Track 5); Joe Nicolo and Phil Nicolo (Track 8).
 Assistant Mixing on Track 8 – Dick Grobelny
 Mastered by Ted Jensen at Sterling Sound (New York, NY).
 Technical Support – Andrew Baker*, Lester Baylinson, Steve Bramberg, Laura Delia, Jon "J.D." Dworkow*, Greg Garland, Peter Goodrich, David Hewitt, Dave Hofbauer, Doug Kleeger, Howie Mendelson, Larry DeMarco, Artie Smith and Courtney Spencer.
  Art and Commerce – Jeff Schock
 Art Direction – Christopher Austopchuk
 Cover Artwork – Christie Brinkley
 Design – Sara Rotman
 Photography – Glen Erler

Aftermath
River of Dreams stands as Billy Joel's most recent studio album of original materials in the pop/rock genre. Joel has often stated that the album itself was designed to stand as his final record and that while he still composes music, he no longer writes within the pop/rock music vein and has no more interest in the recording industry. Accordingly, Joel's succeeding one-off studio album Fantasies & Delusions, released in 2001, was an instrumental album of classical piano pieces containing no pop songs whatsoever. However, there is currently a petition online at Change.org created by a group of Billy Joel fans asking him to put out at least one more studio album with new songs of original materials in the pop/rock genre.

Accolades

Grammy Awards

|-
| width="35" align="center" rowspan="4"|1994 || River of Dreams || Album of the Year || 
|-
|rowspan=3|"The River of Dreams" || Song of the Year || 
|-
| Record of the Year || 
|-
| Best Pop Vocal Performance – Male ||

Charts

Weekly charts

Year-end charts

Certifications and sales

References

1993 albums
albums produced by Danny Kortchmar
Billy Joel albums
Columbia Records albums